Said Hamich (b. 1986 in Fez) is a Moroccan-French film producer and director.

Biography 
Born in Morocco, Hamich lived in Bollène until he left for Paris after finishing his secondary education. He graduated from Fémis (department of film production) then worked as a producer for Barney Production which he founded before his first film, Retour à Bollène, that was filmed in February 2017.

Filmography

Producer and director 

 2018 : Retour à Bollène
2021: Le Départ

Producer 

 2015 : Much Loved by Nabil Ayouch
 2017 : Volubilis by Faouzi Bensaïdi
 2018 : Vent du nord by Walid Mattar

References

External links 
 

1986 births
French film producers
French film directors
Moroccan film producers
Moroccan film directors
Living people